The 1985 U.S. Women's Open was the 40th U.S. Women's Open, held July 11–14 at the Upper Course of Baltusrol Golf Club, in Springfield, New Jersey, west of New York City.

Kathy Baker, 24, won her first LPGA Tour event and only major title, three strokes ahead of runner-up Judy Clark (later Dickinson). Baker (later Guadagnino) held the lead after 54 holes at 210 (−6), one stroke ahead of Clark and 36-hole leader Nancy Lopez.

The 153-player field included 24 amateurs.

The Upper Course previously hosted the U.S. Open in 1936, won by Tony Manero. The U.S. Women's Open in 1961 was played on the more renowned Lower Course, where Mickey Wright won the third of her four titles.

Past champions in the field

Made the cut

Source:

Missed the cut

Source:

Final leaderboard
Sunday, July 14, 1985

Source:

References

External links
U.S. Women's Open – past champions – 1985

U.S. Women's Open
Golf in New Jersey
Sports competitions in New Jersey
U.S. Women's Open
U.S. Women's Open
U.S. Women's Open
1985 in sports in New Jersey
Women's sports in New Jersey